Esperantina is a municipality in the state of Piauí in the Northeast region of Brazil.

The town is the home of International Female Orgasm Day which was established in 2007 by José Arimatéia Dantas Lacerda. The holiday is celebrated each August 8.

See also
List of municipalities in Piauí

References

Municipalities in Piauí